, also called , is a trademark of Bandai. Among the variety of vending machine-dispensed capsule toys that originated in the 1960s, it became popular in Japan and elsewhere. "Gashapon" is onomatopoeic from the two sounds "gasha" (or "gacha") for the hand-cranking action of a toy-vending machine, and "pon" for the toy capsule landing in the collection tray. "Gashapon" is used for both the machines themselves and the toys obtained from them. Popular capsule toy manufacturers include Tomy, which uses the trademark  for their capsule machines, and Kaiyodo. In many countries including Japan, China, United States and the United Kingdom, "Gashapon" is a registered trademark of Bandai. The model of capsule toy has been adapted digitally into numerous gacha video games, such as mobile phone games and massively multiplayer online games (MMOs).

Description 

Gashapon machines are similar to the coin-operated toy vending machines seen outside grocery stores and other retailers in other countries. They are often constructed from high-grade PVC plastic, and contain more molding detail and intricately painted features. Many gashapon are considered collector's items, with rare ones fetching extremely high prices in secondhand markets.

Gashapon toys are often licensed from popular characters in Japanese manga, video games or anime, or from the American entertainment industry. These highly detailed toys have found a large following among all generations in Japan, and the trend is filtering to the world, especially among adult collectors. It is not uncommon for sets marketed specifically for adults to feature risqué female figurines.

Virtually all gashapon are released in sets—each series will have a number of figures to collect. They are, by nature, a "blind purchase"; people insert coins and hope to get the toy or figure they desire. Such an amusement element may become frustrating, as one risks obtaining the same item repeatedly.

Enthusiastic collectors will buy sets from gashapon stores in places such as Tokyo's Akihabara or Osaka's Nipponbashi (Den-Den Town). Depending on the store, the sets are usually cheaper than buying them randomly out of a machine.

Bandai has been selling Gashapon toys since at least 1977.

Types

Blind-boxes 
In recent years, the capsule toys have also come to refer to blind-box trading figures, which are essentially the same product sold randomly out of sealed packages instead of a machine.

Bottle cap figures 
Another variety of capsule toys is bottle cap figures. These small figures are mounted atop a plastic bottle cap, as might be found on a twenty-ounce soda bottle. They are sold both in machine capsules and blind boxes. The caps are not functional as they lack screw threads to secure them to the mouth of the bottle.

Video games

Mini games 
Capsule toy machines and their random payouts have inspired trinket-collection mini-games in many video games, most notably the Legend of Zelda series' similarly named "Gasha Trees" in Oracle of Ages and Oracle of Seasons, and, to a much higher extent, the random figurine payout in The Minish Cap. capsule toys have also appeared in some Mario games such as Mario Party 5 and well as Super Smash Bros. Melee where the player inserts a desired amount of coins and gets a trophy of a Nintendo-related nature in return. In both The Minish Cap and Super Smash Bros. Melee, the more the player spends in one go, the higher the chance of getting a new item in return.  Gudetama mobile game app Gudetama Tap features a variety of "eggarapons" that dispense prizes for use in the larger game.

Gacha-expanded games 
In SD Gundam Gashapon Wars, a game based on the SD Gundam television series, players can activate extra characters from the game by buying certain series of SD Gundam gashapon toys in real life, namely SD Full Color STAGE:61, then use the password bundled with the toy to unlock the corresponding character in the video game. This is the same marketing tactic used by Kinder Surprise for the online surprises, except there is no online access involved.

Gacha mechanic (gacha games)
Many free-to-play MMOs and mobile games have mechanics inspired by capsule toys, with randomly generated items of varying market values being acquired via microtransactions.
 In the NES game Mega Man 4 there is an enemy named Gachappon which is a capsule toy vending machine modified to shoot energy shots and other kinds of projectiles. The Chip Trader from the Mega Man Battle Network series also functions similarly to capsule toy machines. In addition, in Mega Man X: Command Mission, capsule toy machines can be found in various places, and contain figures of various Mega Man characters.
 In the online massively multiplayer online game PangYa the capsule toy is a small Adobe Flash-powered mini-game in which users buy coins using real money, and in turn will give out items ranging from common, low-value items to rare, high-value items.  There is also a consistent theme of capsule toy items being released in sets, much like their real-life counterparts.
 The machines also appear in the Dreamcast game Shenmue, in which the main character Ryo Hazuki could spend yen to collect various figurines, including series of characters from the Virtua Fighter and Sonic the Hedgehog series of games as well as those of other known and lesser known Sega franchises (e.g. Fantasy Zone, Space Harrier, Hang-On).
 The GameCube game Gotcha Force is completely based on capsule toys, pitting a massive variety of capsule toy-sized/themed aliens (called Borgs) against each other and the Galactic Emperor.  As the player progresses, they earn new fighters that open from capsules, some of which require multiple parts to complete.  Tying into the capsule toy theme even more are the variants that come in a range of styles from an alternate coloring to completely transparent to solid silver, gold, and black versions.
 In Kingdom Hearts II, there is a rare type of Heartless called the "Bulky Vendor", based on a capsule toy machine. Only appearing in certain areas of some worlds, its HP bar drops quickly and it jumps and moves faster as time goes on. The player is required to catch up with it and use a Reaction command, from 'Capsule Prize' up to 'Prime Capsule' to receive a capsule which explodes into orbs and an item prize. This is the only way (besides treasure chests) to gain the valuable Orichalcum item.
 The PSP game Work Time Fun consists of nothing but playing small mini-games for money to spend in capsule toy machines. The machines deposit trinkets whose descriptions often poke fun at common capsule toy trinkets.
 In the 1998 Yu-Gi-Oh! Toei Animation-produced anime series and the original manga, there are a series of episodes where players play a game called Capsule Monsters (Capmon for short) that involves the use of a capsule toy machine to obtain the game pieces in which players used. Mokuba is seen playing this game the most, and is usually Yugi's enemy when it comes to playing this game. In a series later on that was released after the final episodes, there was a special movie that used these Capsule Monsters as a main part of the game. However, unlike the other Capsule Monsters, these ones were made out of bronze or gold, and were shot out from a capsule shooter to battle.
 The Crank-a-Kai machine in Level-5's Yo-kai Watch series is a capsule machine, from which the main character indirectly receives the titular device. By inserting coins, the player can obtain capsules containing items or Yokai. In homage to this, Yo-kai Watch merchandise can be found in capsule toy machines in Japan. There is also a Yo-kai who presides over the world's capsule toy machines, including the Crank-a-Kai. It fights using capsules obtained within its own personal capsule toy machine.

Capsule toy-style item distribution has been adopted by many massively multiplayer online games, particularly those using the free-to-play model as a form of premium transaction made with real money, often granting access to items exclusive to that system. Examples are:
 In the MMO MapleStory, the capsule toy machine is used as a gambling type machine, wherein players can purchase with real money tickets which, when used at the capsule toy, will allow the player to receive a random item of random value.
 Similarly, in Mabinogi, the premium shop sells capsule toy items that hold a variety of in-game items the player can use, such as dyes or armor as well as exclusively colored items and exclusive armor and clothing.
 The MMO Cosmic Break uses a capsule toy machine called "Garapon". It has 5 rarities signified by the color of the capsule. Gold is the highest rarity in the game. However, the Garapon is highly controversial due to the pricing and extremely low chance of obtaining these items. It usually costs $3–5 per spin, as such, due to rarity issues, people have had to spend hundreds of dollars to just get one gold capsule.
 In Second Life, many stores run by users of the game have created their own capsule toy-style devices called "Gacha" that sell random objects in their shops. This practice is now a violation of the game's policies.

Gacha games 

Games—often freemium—largely based on a gacha mechanism of monetization are referred to as gacha games. The gacha game model arose in the early 2010s, faring particularly well in Japan. Players may be given free or discounted gacha, but have to pay to get more. The games may feature different tiers of gacha pulls, which give different sets of rewards. Examples of gacha games are Final Fantasy: Brave Exvius, Fire Emblem Heroes, Puzzle & Dragons, and Dragon Collection. The mechanism has come under scrutiny for its similarity to gambling, and some countries require drop rates to be made public, or have banned certain practices (e.g., complete gacha).

See also 
 Designer toys
 Figurine
 Gumball machine
 Model figure
 Urban vinyl

References

External links 

 Gashapon at Bandai 

Vending
Vending machines
Toy collecting
Japanese inventions